Talhotblond may refer to:

 Talhotblond (2009 film), documentary directed by Barbara Schroeder
 TalhotBlond (2012 film), TV film directed by Courteney Cox